The 2019 FIS Cross-Country Australia/New Zealand Cup was a season of the Australia/New Zealand Cup, a Continental Cup season in cross-country skiing for men and women. The season began on 27 July 2019 in Falls Creek, Victoria, Australia and concluded on 5 September 2019 in Snow Farm, New Zealand.

Calendar

Men

Women

Overall standings

Men's overall standings

Women's overall standings

References

External links
2019 Overall Standings Men
2019 Overall Standings Women

FIS Cross-Country Australia/New Zealand Cup
FIS Cross-Country Australia/New Zealand Cup seasons
2019 in cross-country skiing